Suman Mukhopadhyay (born 20 November 1966) is an Indian film director.His popular films are Herbert (film), Kangal Malsat, Shesher Kobita (2014).

Career
Suman Mukhopadhyay is currently visiting New York on a Fulbright Fellowship with Columbia University. 

His first cinematic directorial debut film was Herbert which was released in 2005. Herbert won the National Award for Best Bengali film.

Suman is in the post-production of his feature film "Putulnacher Itikatha", based on the novel by Manik Bandyopadhyay. His latest feature film is "Nazarband". The film premiered at Busan International Film Festival 2020. His earlier film is "Asamapta"(Incomplete), premiered in IFFLA, USA. Before that "Shesher Kabita" (The Last Poem) with Rahul Bose and Konkona Sen Sharma premiered in Dubai International Film Festival and released on 7 August 2015. "Kangal Malsat"(The War Cry of the Beggars) his 4th feature film released in August 2013.  Mahanagar@Kolkata was completed in 2009. The film was screened in Munich, Kerala and New York film festivals.  His second film Chaturanga, based on Tagore's novel, was completed in 2008 and premiered at the Montreal World Film Festival. Chaturanga was screened in 36 national and international festivals. The film received a Gran Prix award at Bridgefest, Sarajevo; the Best Director award at the Philadelphia Independent Film Festival and the Golden Palm at Mexico International Film Festival.

Recently Mukhopadhyay has done a Zee5 original feature film Posham Pa and directed five episodes of Parchhayee based on Ruskin Bond stories.

Suman's latest production is "Shikhandi", a solo act, which opened in New Jersey. (June 2022).
Mukhopadhyay has done theatre productions ranging from European drama to major adaptations of Bengali works. He used to be a part of the Bengali theatre Group Chetana. Among his many works some are The Cherry Orchard (Anton Chekhov) with National School of Drama, Raja Lear (Shakespeare'a King Lear) with Minerva Repertory Theatre, Sunyo Sudhu Sunyo Noy, Bisarjan (Rabindranath Tagore), Teesta Paarer Brittanto and Samay Asamayer Brittanto, adapted from the novels by Debesh Roy and Mephisto, based on Klaus Mann's German novel. He has also staged Rabindranath Tagore's Raktakarabi; Falguni-Prelude, Shakespeare/Brecht's Coriolanus and Śūdraka's The Little Clay Cart. He directed The Man of the Heart  (Life and times of Lalon Fokir) at the University of California, Berkeley and Girish Karnad's Nagamandala at the Department of Theatre, Kalamazoo College, Michigan. Man of the Heart was also invited to Barbican Centre, London.

Filmography

Feature films 
Herbert (2005)
Chaturanga (2008)
Mahanagar@Kolkata (2009)
Kangal Malsat (2013)
Shesher Kobita (2014)
Asamapta (2017)
Nazarband (2020)
Posham Pa (2019)
Putul Nacher Itikotha

Awards
"Nazarband" - Audience Award at River to River Indian Film Festival, Florence

"Posham Pa' - Kali Film Award at Female Filmmakers Festival, Berlin

Recipient of MPA/APSA Script Development Award at Asia Pacific Screen Awards, Brisbane
  
His film Chaturanga received the Gran Prix at Bridge Fest, Sarajevo;  Best Director at Philadelphia Independent Film Festival and the Golden Palm at Mexico International Film Festival.
His film Herbert for Silver Lotus for the National Film Award for Best Feature Film in Bengali, 2005.Audience Award at the Dhaka International Film Festival, 2006.

Others 

Mukhopadhyay is a known face of Civil Society Movement in West Bengal from the tenure of Left Front Government. He also participated in rallies or talk shows against political violence by all the parties. On 21 June he joined in a protest march in Metro Channel with other intellectuals of Kolkata led by poet Shankha Ghosh in protest against the growing crimes against women in the state and the 2013 Kamduni gang rape and murder case.

References

External links
 

1944 births
Living people
21st-century Indian film directors
Film directors from Kolkata
Bengali Hindus
Bengali film producers
Bengali film directors
Bengali writers
Film theorists
Indian film score composers
Bengali-language writers
Film producers from Kolkata
Indian theatre directors
Bengali theatre personalities
People from Howrah